Pierre Hudsyn (14 September 1894 – 26 December 1978) was a Belgian racing cyclist. He rode in the 1920 Tour de France.

References

1894 births
1978 deaths
Belgian male cyclists
Place of birth missing